Walter Feigl (4 January 1906 – 8 July 1972) was an Austrian footballer.

References

1906 births
1972 deaths
Association football goalkeepers
Austrian footballers
SK Rapid Wien players